Ivar Aarseth (5 October 1889 – 31 July 1972) was a Norwegian politician.

He was born in Veøy to farmers Knut Aarseth and Oline Horsgaard. He was elected representative to the Storting for the periods 1925–1927, 1928–1930, 1934–1936 and 1937–1945, for the Labour Party. During the German occupation of Norway, he was imprisoned and held at the Berg internment camp from October 1944 to March 1945.

References

1889 births
People from Møre og Romsdal
Labour Party (Norway) politicians
Members of the Storting
Berg concentration camp survivors
Norwegian prisoners and detainees
1972 deaths